Nes is the second largest village on the island of Ameland, one of the West Frisian Islands in the northern Netherlands.

It constitutes as the main village of the eastern, Roman Catholic part of Ameland and had, as of January 2017, a population of 1,155. In the past, the Catholic Amelanders were involved in many conflicts with the western, Protestant Amelanders living in Hollum and Ballum.
Nes has since become a popular tourist destination, as the place where the ferry from the mainland arrives. The village has many small shops and restaurants, a microdistillery, and a windmill, De Phenix.

Harbour 
At Nes, on the south side of Ameland, lie the spring dock and marina on the island, one of the 17 Wadden Sea ports. The rescue station KNRM has separate these facilities in the Ballumerbocht, about 4 km east of the causeway. The marina is managed by the Foundation Marina Leyegat and is open from April 1st until November 1st. At low tide, the port only to sail on small boats because of the shallow depth of 0.60 to 0.80 m at the harbor entrance. Acceptances route through the Reegeul is straight and clearly marked out. The harbor entrance is on the east side of the ferry jetty, from the Reegeul should be considered separately and accepts ferries and excursion boats. Traps can dry in various places, such as the east of the marina. The port has floating docks with power, a port office with meteorological and tidal information and sanitation.

Gallery

References

External links

Ameland
Populated places in Friesland